Jayanthi Kuru-Utumpala (born 3 September 1979) is a Sri Lankan adventurer, professional rock climber, motivational speaker, and LGBT and women's rights activist. She is the first person from Sri Lanka to summit Mount Everest which she achieved on 21 May 2016. Kuru-Utumpala is an advocate for women's rights in Sri Lanka and has spent most of her adult life researching gender studies and women's rights. She formed a collaboration with fellow mountaineer Johann Peries for several expeditions.

Biography 
Jayanthi Kuru-Utumpala was born on 3 September 1979 in Colombo. Her father Nissanka is a mechanical engineer and her mother Jacinta was a manager in the hospitality industry. Her elder brother Rukshan attended the S. Thomas' College in Mount Lavinia. She was described as a fearless person at her young age by her brother.

Career 
Kuru-Utumpala joined Bishop's College in 1984 for her primary education and also pursued her secondary education at the same school until 1998. After finishing her schooling, she joined the Sri Lanka Foundation Institute in 1999 to pursue a diploma in journalism and communication. She joined the Miranda House of the Delhi University in 2000 and obtained her BA degree in English literature in 2003. She also completed the military style 28-day Basic Course in Mountaineering and the 28-day Advanced Course in Mountaineering from the  Himalayan Mountaineering Institute in 2003 and 2004 respectively. She obtained a post graduate diploma in 2007 in women's studies from the University of Colombo.

Kuru-Utumpala won a scholarship to study at the University of Sussex in UK and obtained her Master of Arts degree in gender studies in 2009. She performed research on women's rights while pursuing her higher studies and has also has given motivational speeches aimed at empowering schoolgirls. Since 2003, she has been a key member of Sri Lanka's women's movement, as well as a part of Women and Media Collective. She served as a specialist in gender and sexuality at Care International Sri Lanka in April 2015. In 2016, she was appointed as the first goodwill ambassador for women's rights in Sri Lanka by the then Minister of Women's Affairs, Chandrani Bandara Jayasinghe.

In 2017, she wrote about her own personal experience of receiving a rare public platform to challenge gender stereotypes in an article titled "After Everest: can mountaineering tackle gender myths in Sri Lanka?"

As part of her feminist activism, together with two other colleagues, she recently co-created Delete Nothing - an online platform aimed at documenting technology related violence in Sri Lanka.

Kuru-Utumpala teamed up with Johann Peries in 2011 and has worked with him in several successful expeditions, including summitting Adam's Peak, Island Peak in 2012, Mount Kilimanjaro in 2014, and her historic summit of Mount Everest in 2016. As an avid rock climber, she has also been rock climbing in Paarl Rocks in Stellenbosch, South Africa, Arneles Mendoza in Argentina, the Pyrenees in Spain, Saxony Switzerland in Germany, in addition to climbing at her local crag at ClimbLanka in Horana. In February 2019, Kuru-Utumpala and Peries officially signed as brand ambassadors of the Hatton National Bank.

Everest expedition 
From 2012 Kuru-Utumpala and Peries trained to summit Everest and participated in various recreational activities, such as swimming and climbing. In April 2016, the duo announced that they were on a mission to climb Mount Everest. They formed the Sri Lankan Everest Expedition campaign, 2016. The expedition, which cost around US$60,000, per person, was supported by the mountaineering company International Mountain Guides, who provided them with guide support, Sherpa support, logistics, meals, and accommodation during their expedition. Kuru-Utumpala and Peries were accompanied by Nepalese Sherpas Ang Karma (Kuru-Utumpala) and Ang Pasang (Peries).

Kuru-Utumpala reached the summit of Mount Everest successfully at 5:03 a.m. on 21 May 2016, while Peries was not able to complete the feat, as his oxygen tank failed  before the summit. Kuru-Utumpala went on to become the first Sri Lankan as well as first and only Sri Lankan woman to have reached the summit of Mount Everest. Kuru-Utumpala's summit also made Sri Lanka the fourth country in the world after Poland, Croatia and South Africa, from which a woman was the first person to reach the top of Mount Everest.

Honours 
Kuru-Utumpala obtained a special award from TV channel Ada Derana as a part of the Ada Derana Sri Lankan of the Year in 2016. She was also included in the BBC's list of 100 inspiring and influential women from around the world for 2017.

In March 2019, she was named as one of the most influential women, and among women change-makers in Sri Lanka, by the Parliament of Sri Lanka coinciding with International Women's Day.

In August 2019, she was one of the 66 recipients to receive national honours for 2019 from the Sri Lankan President Maithripala Sirisena.

References 

1979 births
Living people
Sinhalese women
Summiters of Mount Everest
Sri Lankan feminists
Sri Lankan activists
Sri Lankan rock climbers
Sri Lankan mountain climbers
BBC 100 Women
Alumni of the University of Sussex
Alumni of the University of Colombo
Alumni of Bishop's College, Colombo
Delhi University alumni
People from Colombo
Sri Lankan LGBT rights activists